Thom Boerman is a retired American football coach.  He served as the head football coach at Bentley University from 2009 to 2013, compiling a career record of 33–17. He shared the Northeast-10 Conference championship in 2009.

Prior to being named head coach in 2009, Boerman was an assistant coach at Bentley, serving as a defensive backs coach from 1986 to 2007 and defensive coordinator in 2008 Boerman announced his retirement at the end of the 2013 season.

Head coaching record

References

Year of birth missing (living people)
Living people
Bentley Falcons football coaches
Ferris State University alumni
Ferris State Bulldogs football players
1950s births